Tsentralno-Miskyi District may refer to:

 Tsentralno-Miskyi District, Horlivka, Ukraine
 Tsentralno-Miskyi District, Kryvyi Rih, Ukraine
 Tsentralno-Miskyi District, Makiivka, Ukraine